Khoranj (also Romanized as Kherenj; also known as Khorani) is a village in Lahijan-e Sharqi Rural District, Lajan District, Piranshahr County, West Azerbaijan Province, Iran. At the 2006 census, its population was 640, in 116 families.

References 

Populated places in Piranshahr County